Anepholcia is a genus of moths of the family Noctuidae.

Species
Anepholcia pygaria Warren, 1912
Anepholcia talboti Prout, 1924

Pantheinae